Antricola guglielmonei is a species of soft shell tick in the family Argasidae. Like Nothoaspis, another genus in the same family, Antricola species infest cave-dwelling bats.  A. guglielmonei is similar to Antricola delacruzi of the same genus and have been found together on bat guano. 

The guano also appears to be a major food source for A. guglielmonei, although the exact component of the guano that is consumed remains unclear. It is indigenous to the Brazilian rain forest.

References

External links
How to get a Tick out of the Skin

Ticks
Parasites of bats
Arachnids of South America
Argasidae
Animals described in 2004